Momed Antônio Hagi (born 29 May 1985), known simply as Hagi, is a Mozambican footballer who plays as a defender for Liga Desportiva de Maputo. He earned 62 caps with the Mozambique national team between 2005 and 2015.

References

External links
 
 

1985 births
Living people
Mozambican footballers
Mozambique international footballers
Association football defenders
Clube Ferroviário de Maputo footballers
Liga Desportiva de Maputo players
2010 Africa Cup of Nations players
Sportspeople from Maputo